Teräsrautela is a district in the Kuninkoja ward of the city of Turku, in Finland. It is located to the west of the city, and is mainly a high-density residential suburb. The large Länsikeskus shopping centre is located in Teräsrautela.

The current population of Teräsrautela is 3,554, and it is increasing at an annual rate of 0.37%. 11.73% of the district's population are under 15 years old, while 20.17% are over 65. The district's linguistic makeup is 96.57% Finnish, 2.42% Swedish, and 1.01% other.

See also
 Districts of Turku
 Districts of Turku by population

Districts of Turku